This is the discography of British R&B singer, Keisha White, which so far consists of ten singles, two studio albums and one compilation album since her debut in 2005.

Studio albums

Compilation albums

Singles

Collaborations

References

External links

Discographies of British artists
Rhythm and blues discographies